Ezra T. Champlin (1839 in Vermont – 1928) was a Minnesota politician and Speaker of the Minnesota House of Representatives, the only member of the Alliance Party ever to lead the chamber. He first served in the Minnesota House of Representatives in 1875, and was sent back to the body from 1887 to 1888. He was elected speaker during his third stint in the legislature, in 1891, as part of an alliance between the Alliance Party and the Democratic Party.

References

1839 births
1928 deaths
Members of the Minnesota House of Representatives
Speakers of the Minnesota House of Representatives